Abingdon High School may refer to:

Abingdon-Avon High School, in Abingdon, Illinois, US
Abingdon High School (Virginia), in Abingdon, Virginia, US
Abingdon School, in Abingdon, Oxfordshire, England, UK

See also 
Abington High School, Abington, Massachusetts, United States
Abingdon Boys School, a Japanese rock band